Erdenebatyn Bekhbayar (born 13 August 1992) is a Mongolian freestyle wrestler who competes in the 57 kg division. He won a gold medal at the 2018 Asian Games and bronze medals at the 2015 and 2017 world championships. He competed at the 2016 Summer Olympics, where he was eliminated in the round of 32 by Adama Diatta.

Bekhbayar took up wrestling in 2006. He was named the 2015 Mongolian Male Athlete of the Year.

References

External links

 
 
 

1992 births
Living people
World Wrestling Championships medalists
Mongolian male sport wrestlers
Olympic wrestlers of Mongolia
Wrestlers at the 2016 Summer Olympics
Wrestlers at the 2018 Asian Games
Medalists at the 2018 Asian Games
Asian Games medalists in wrestling
Asian Games gold medalists for Mongolia
Asian Wrestling Championships medalists
Wrestlers at the 2020 Summer Olympics
Sportspeople from Ulaanbaatar